Kimré is an East Chadic language spoken in the Tandjilé Region of Chad. Like most related languages, it is popularly called both "Kimre" and "Gabri".

References

Languages of Chad
East Chadic languages